() was an annual music competition, which was originally organised by the Dutch public broadcaster  (NTS), and later by the  (NOS) and the  (TROS). It was staged almost every year between 1956 and 2012 to determine the country's entry for the Eurovision Song Contest. The festival has produced four Eurovision winners and eight top-five placings for the Netherlands at the contest.

Due to declining interest in the competition and the Netherlands' poor performance in the Eurovision Song Contest in the late 2000s and early 2010s, it was decided that the Dutch entry for the Eurovision Song Contest 2013 would be internally selected. As this led to the Netherlands' best Eurovision result in over ten years,  has not been organised since. The children's version of the competition, is still active.

History 

After the 2006 edition, the NOS stated that it no longer wanted to organise the competition. After a two-year hiatus, the TROS took over the event in 2009.

Throughout the years, different formats were used to determine which artist and/or song would represent the Netherlands in the Eurovision Song Contest. The competition was usually held in February or March. In 1985, 1991, 1995 and 2002,  was not organised, because the Netherlands would not take part in that year's Eurovision Song Contest.

In 1961, 1963, 1980, 2007 and 2008, the Dutch entry for the Eurovision Song Contest was not selected through , but was chosen internally by a special committee. The 1963 edition of  had been scheduled to take place on 23 January at the Tivoli in Utrecht, but was cancelled due to a strike of the Metropole Orchestra. In 2007, a special edition of the show , titled , was broadcast in which Edsilia Rombley performed three potential Eurovision entries, after which she announced which song she had picked.

2009–2012: Final years 

After a two-year hiatus,  returned in 2009 as the selection method for the Dutch Eurovision entry; this time to select a song for De Toppers, who had been internally selected by the TROS as the Dutch representatives. In 2010, this format was reversed when the song "" written by Pierre Kartner was internally selected, and the performer was chosen through . Both schlager acts failed to qualify for the final of the Eurovision Song Contest and were subject of heavy criticism in the Netherlands.

He attributed the Netherlands' poor performance in the Eurovision Song Contest to the NOS and TROS's limited budgets, which did not allow established songwriters to present their songs in the best possible way, thereby making it unattractive to submit an entry.

After more disappointing Eurovision results that  continued to produce in 2011 and 2012, Anouk approached TROS to represent the Netherlands in the Eurovision Song Contest 2013. While initially TROS was pushing for another  selection that year, Anouk refused to participate in it and wanted to be internally selected with full creative control over the entry. Ultimately, TROS decided to select her, and she went on to represent the country with the song "Birds".

Voting 

In the 1956, 1957, 1958 and 1967 editions, the winning entry was chosen through postcard voting: the public could vote by sending a postcard with the title of their favourite song to a specified address, with the song that received the most postcards being declared the winner. Many editions had twelve regional juries, one for each province (and one for the Zuidelijke IJsselmeerpolders prior to becoming a separate province). Other editions had a single (international) professional jury or expert panel.

A notable voting method was used in 1975, when the audience in the Jaarbeurs was asked to put a rose in one of three vases corresponding to the three competing entries. The vase containing the most roses (the one of Teach-In) was declared the winner. Televoting was first introduced in the 1997 edition. Since then, the voting system of  has often been a combination of jury voting and televoting, largely resembling the voting system of the Eurovision Song Contest. 

The voting in the 2010 edition led to much controversy, as it resulted in a tie which – according to the rules – had to be broken by composer Pierre Kartner. Kartner refused to choose between the two artists as he considered them to be "equally strong", and suggested to decide by flipping a coin instead. After much insistence from presenter Yolanthe Cabau, Kartner ultimately chose Sieneke as the winner of the competition.

Past editions

Special shows

Winners

Gallery

Musical styles and artists 

In the early years of the competition,  entries used to be entirely in Dutch, even though the Eurovision rules did not dictate any language restrictions until 1966. The rule that a country's entries must be performed in one of its national languages was first abolished in 1973, which led to the 1974 en 1975  winners "" and "" being performed in English at the Eurovision Song Contest (as "I See a Star" and "Ding-a-dong"). In 1976, "The Party's Over" by Sandra Reemer was the first song in a language other than Dutch to win . 

The Eurovision Song Contest's language rule was reintroduced in 1977 and abolished once again in 1999, after which the majority of entries at each year's  were performed in English. The 2000 edition marked the first time an entry in West Frisian, "" by Gina de Wit, was selected to take part in the competition. In 2003, the operatic pop entry "" by Arwin Kluft was the first to be fully in Italian. In 2006, the lyrics of the winning song "Amambanda" by Treble were partly in an imaginary language.

Throughout the years, the competition also diversified in terms of musical styles. In its early years, Dutch chansons and jazz songs dominated in the competition. Later, there was also room for more experimental entries, such as the rumba song "" by Milly Scott (1st, 1966). Entries in this genre included "No Goodbyes" by Linda Wagenmakers (1st, 2000), "So Much Love" by Ebonique (2nd, 2001), and "One More Night" by Esther Hart (1st, 2003). In the same period, the a cappella genre made its debut with the entries "" (3rd, 2001) and "Celeste" (5th, 2004).

Notable newcomers included Justine Pelmelay (1989), Marlayne (1999), Ben and Dean Saunders (2003), and Waylon (2005).

See also
Dansk Melodi Grand Prix
Liet International
Melodi Grand Prix
Melodifestivalen
Sanremo Music Festival

References

External links
 
 

 
Dutch music television series
Eurovision Song Contest selection events
1956 Dutch television series debuts
Music festivals established in 1956